Tertius may refer to:

People
Tertius of Iconium, first century Christian martyr, saint and bishop
Tertius, fifth century Christian martyr and saint (see Denise, Dativa, Leontia, Tertius, Emilianus, Boniface, Majoricus, and Servus)
Tertius Bosch (1966-2000), South African cricketer
Tertius Chandler (1915-2000) American historian and author
Tertius Delport, South African politician
Tertius Losper (born 1985), Namibian rugby union fullback
T. Tertius Noble (1867-1953), English-born organist and composer
Tertius Zongo (born 1957), former Prime Minister of Burkina Faso

Other uses
Tertius (law), a term in contract law referring to an interested third party
Tertius, transcriber of the Epistle to the Romans 
Tertius, the underworld of Pluto (mythology)
Tertius Lydgate, a main character in George Eliot's novel Middlemarch
Tertius, a planet in Robert A . Heinlein's science fiction novel Time Enough for Love and subsequent books featuring Lazarus Long
Tertius (sandbank), a German sandbank in Meldorf Bay

See also
Alexander Monro (tertius), named "Tertius" to distinguish him from his grandfather and father
Tertia (disambiguation), the feminine form of Tertius